The Devil is an upcoming South Korean occult mystery thriller television series written by Kim Eun-hee, directed by Lee Jung-rim, and starring Kim Tae-ri, Oh Jung-se and Hong Kyung. It is scheduled for release on SBS TV in June 2023.

Synopsis 
The series revolves around a woman possessed by a devil and a man who can see the devil and seeks the truth behind the mysterious deaths surrounding the five bodies.

Cast

Main 
 Kim Tae-ri as Gu San-yeong
 A public prosecutor who has been preparing for the 9th grade civil service exam. She gets entangled in mysterious deaths, after receiving her late father's belonging.
 Oh Jung-se as Yeom Hae-sang
 A folklore professor from a wealthy family. He has the ability to see spirits and gods.
 Hong Kyung as Lee Hong-sae
 A former police officer and a violent crime investigation unit inspector.

Supporting 
 Yang Hye-ji as Baek Se-mi
 Gu San-yeong's high school classmate who is preparing for the civil service exam.
 Kim Shin-bi

Special appearance 
 Jin Seon-kyu as Gu San-yeong's father 
 Pyo Ye-jin

References

External links
  
 
 

Upcoming television series
Korean-language television shows 
2023 South Korean television series debuts
Seoul Broadcasting System television dramas
South Korean mystery television series
South Korean thriller television series
Television series by Studio S